Thomas Johnson Ormerod (b. Great Missenden 18 May 1810 – d. Redenhall 2 December 1874) was an English academic and churchman, Archdeacon of Suffolk from  1846 to 1868.

Ormerod was educated at Brasenose College, Oxford, matriculating in 1826 and graduating B.A. in 1830. He was a Lecturer in Hebrew and Divinity at Oxford University until his appointment as Rector of Redenhall in 1847.

References

1810 births
1874 deaths
19th-century English Anglican priests
Alumni of Brasenose College, Oxford
Archdeacons of Suffolk
People from Buckinghamshire (before 1965)